The following is a list of certain awards and nominations received by the actor Samuel L. Jackson.

Major associations

Academy Awards

BAFTA Awards

Golden Globe Awards

Independent Spirit Awards

Screen Actors Guild Awards

Cannes Film Festival

Berlin International Film Festival

Miscellaneous awards

Annie Awards

Audie Awards

Black Reel Awards

MTV Movie Awards

NAACP Image Awards

Saturn Awards

Teen Choice Awards

Film critic awards

Miscellaneous awards

Inductions

See also
 Samuel L. Jackson filmography

References

External links

Jackson, Samuel L.